Archduke Charles Louis John Joseph Laurentius of Austria, Duke of Teschen (5 September 177130 April 1847) was an Austrian field-marshal, the third son of Emperor Leopold II and his wife, Maria Luisa of Spain. He was also the younger brother of Francis II, Holy Roman Emperor. He was epileptic, and achieved respect both as a commander and as a reformer of the Austrian army. He was considered one of Napoleon's more formidable opponents and one of the greatest generals of the French Revolutionary Wars.

He began his career fighting the revolutionary armies of France. Early in the wars of the First Coalition, he saw victory at Neerwinden in 1793, before being defeated at Wattignies in 1793 and Fleurus in 1794. In 1796, as chief of all Austrian forces on the Rhine, Charles defeated Jean-Baptiste Jourdan at Amberg, Würzburg and Limburg, and then won victories at Wetzlar, Emmendingen and Schliengen that forced Jean Victor Marie Moreau to withdraw across the Rhine. He also defeated opponents at Zürich, Ostrach, Stockach, and Mannheim in 1799. He reformed Austria's armies to adopt the nation-at-arms principle. In 1809, he entered the War of the Fifth Coalition and inflicted Napoleon's first major setback at Aspern-Essling, before suffering a defeat at the bloody Battle of Wagram. After Wagram, Charles saw no more significant action in the Napoleonic Wars.

As a military strategist, Charles was able to successfully execute complex and risky maneuvers of troops. However, his contemporary Carl von Clausewitz criticized his rigidity and adherence to "geographic" strategy. Many Austrians nevertheless remember Charles as a hero of the French Revolutionary and Napoleonic Wars.

Youth and early career

Charles was born in Florence, Tuscany. His father, then Grand Duke of Tuscany, generously permitted Charles's childless aunt Archduchess Maria Christina of Austria and her husband Albert of Saxe-Teschen to adopt and raise the boy in Vienna. Charles spent his youth in Tuscany, at Vienna and in the Austrian Netherlands, where he began his career of military service in the wars of the French Revolution. He commanded a brigade at the Battle of Jemappes (1792), and in the campaign of 1793 distinguished himself at the Action of Aldenhoven and the Battle of Neerwinden. In this year he became Governor of the Habsburg Netherlands, an office he lost with the occupation of the Low Countries by the French revolutionaries in 1794. The year he became Governor he also received the army rank of lieutenant field marshal. Shortly thereafter another promotion saw him made Feldzeugmeister (equivalent of Lieutenant General). In the remainder of the war in the Low Countries he held high commands, and was present at the Battle of Fleurus (1794).

In 1795 he served on the Rhine, and in the following year, he was entrusted with chief control of all the Austrian forces on that river. His conduct of the operations against Jourdan and Moreau in 1796 marked him out at once as one of the greatest generals in Europe. At first, falling back carefully and avoiding a decision, he finally marched away, leaving a mere screen in front of Moreau. Falling upon Jourdan, he beat him in the battles of Amberg (August), Würzburg and Limburg (September), and drove him over the Rhine with great loss. He then turned upon Moreau's army, which he defeated and forced out of Germany after the battles of Wetzlar, Emmendingen and Schliengen.

Napoleonic Wars

In 1797 he was sent to arrest the victorious march of General Bonaparte in Italy, and he conducted the retreat of the over-matched Austrians with the highest skill. In the campaign of 1799 he once more opposed Jourdan, whom he defeated in the battles of Ostrach and Stockach, following up his success by invading Switzerland and defeating Masséna in the First Battle of Zurich, after which he re-entered Germany and drove the French once more over the Rhine after winning at Mannheim in 1799.

Ill-health, however, forced him to retire to Bohemia, but he was soon recalled to undertake the task of checking Moreau's advance on Vienna. The result of the Battle of Hohenlinden had, however, foredoomed the attempt, and the archduke had to make the armistice of Steyr. His popularity was now such that the Perpetual Diet of Regensburg, which met in 1802, resolved to erect a statue in his honor and to give him the title of savior of his country, but Charles refused both distinctions.

In the short and disastrous war of 1805 Archduke Charles commanded what was intended to be the main army in Italy, but events made Germany the decisive theatre of operations; Austria sustained defeat on the Danube, and the archduke was defeated by Massena in the Battle of Caldiero. With the conclusion of peace he began his active work of army reorganization, which was first tested on the field in 1809.

In 1806 Francis II (now Francis I of Austria) named the Archduke Charles, already a field marshal, as Commander in Chief of the Austrian army and Head of the Council of War. Supported by the prestige of being the only general who had proved capable of defeating the French, he promptly initiated a far-reaching scheme of reform, which replaced the obsolete methods of the 18th century. The chief characteristics of the new order were the adoption of the nation in arms principle and the adoption of French war organization and tactics. The army reforms were not yet completed by the war of 1809, in which Charles acted as commander in chief, yet even so it proved a far more formidable opponent than the old and was only defeated after a desperate struggle involving Austrian victories and large loss of life on both sides.

Its initial successes were neutralized by the reverses of Abensberg, Landshut and Eckmühl but, after the evacuation of Vienna, the archduke won a strong victory at the Battle of Aspern-Essling but soon afterwards lost at the Battle of Wagram after heavy casualties on both sides. At the end of the campaign the archduke gave up all his military offices.

In 1808, when Napoleon had crowned his brother Joseph king of Spain, Archduke Charles had said to his brother, Emperor Francis II, "Now we know what Napoleon wants – he wants everything".

Later life

When Austria joined the ranks of the allies during the War of the Sixth Coalition, Charles was not given a command and the post of commander-in-chief of the allied Grand Army of Bohemia went to the Prince of Schwarzenberg. Charles spent the rest of his life in retirement, except for a short time in 1815 when he was military governor of the Fortress Mainz. In 1822 he succeeded to the duchy of Saxe-Teschen.

On 15 September/17 September 1815 in Weilburg, Charles married Princess Henrietta of Nassau-Weilburg (1797–1829). She was a daughter of Frederick William of Nassau-Weilburg (1768–1816) and his wife Burgravine Louise Isabelle of Kirchberg.

Frederick William was the eldest surviving son of Karl Christian of Nassau-Weilburg and Princess Wilhelmine Carolina of Orange-Nassau.

Wilhelmine Carolina was a daughter of William IV, Prince of Orange and Anne, Princess Royal and Princess of Orange. Anne was in turn the eldest daughter of George II of Great Britain and Caroline of Ansbach.

Charles died at Vienna on 30 April 1847. He is buried in tomb 122 in the New Vault of the Imperial Crypt in Vienna. An equestrian statue was erected to his memory on the Heldenplatz in Vienna in 1860.

Assessment of his achievements

The caution which the archduke preached so earnestly in his strategic works, he displayed in practice only when the situation seemed to demand it, though his education certainly prejudiced him in favor of the defensive at all costs. He was at the same time capable of forming and executing the most daring offensive strategy, and his tactical skill in the handling of troops, whether in wide turning movements, as at Würzburg and Zürich, or in masses, as at Aspern and Wagram, was certainly equal to that of any leader of his time, with only a few exceptions.

According to the Encyclopædia Britannica Eleventh Edition, his campaign of 1796 is considered almost faultless. That he sustained defeat in 1809 was due in part to the great numerical superiority of the French and their allies, and in part to the condition of his newly reorganized troops. His six weeks' inaction after the victory of Aspern is, however, open to unfavorable criticism. As a military writer, his position in the evolution of the art of war is very important, and his doctrines had naturally the greatest weight. Nevertheless, they cannot but be considered antiquated even in 1806. Caution and the importance of strategic points are the chief features of his system. The rigidity of his geographical strategy may be gathered from the prescription that "this principle is never to be departed from."

Again and again he repeated the advice that nothing should be hazarded unless one's army is completely secure, a rule which he himself neglected with such brilliant results in 1796. Strategic points, he says, not the defeat of the enemy's army, decide the fate of one's own country, and must constantly remain the general's main concern, a maxim which was never more remarkably disproved than in the war of 1809. The editor of the archduke's work is able to make but a feeble defense against Clausewitz's reproach that Charles attached more value to ground than to the annihilation of the foe. In his tactical writings the same spirit is conspicuous. His reserve in battle is designed to "cover a retreat."

The baneful influence of these antiquated principles was clearly shown in the maintenance of Königgrätz-Josefstadt in 1866 as a strategic point, which was preferred to the defeat of the separated Prussian armies, and in the strange plans produced in Vienna for the campaign of 1859, and in the almost unintelligible Battle of Montebello in the same year. The theory and the practice of Archduke Charles form one of the most curious contrasts in military history. In the one he is unreal, in the other he displayed, along with the greatest skill, a vivid activity which made him for long the most formidable opponent of Napoleon.

He was the 831st Knight of the Order of the Golden Fleece in Austria.

Creation of the Austrian staff
When Karl Mack von Leiberich became chief of staff of the army under Prince Josias of Saxe-Coburg-Saalfeld in the Netherlands, he issued the Instruktionspunkte fur die gesamte Herren Generals, the last of 19 points setting out the roles of staff officers, dealing with offensive and defensive operations, while helping the Commander-in-chief. In 1796, Archduke Charles augmented these with his own Observationspunkte, writing of the Chief of Staff: "he is duty bound to consider all possibilities related to operations and not view himself as merely carrying out those instructions".  On 20 March 1801, Feldmarschalleutnant Duka became the world's first peacetime Generalquartiermeister at the head of the staff and the wartime role of the Chief of Staff was now focused on planning and operations to assist the Commander. Archduke Charles produced a new Dienstvorschrift on 1 September 1805, which divided the staff into three: 1) Political Correspondence; 2) the Operations Directorate, dealing with planning and intelligence; 3) the Service Directorate, dealing with administration, supply and military justice. The Archduke set out the position of a modern Chief of Staff: "The Chief of Staff stands at the side of the Commander-in-Chief and is completely at his disposal. His sphere of work connects him with no specific unit". "The Commander-in-Chief decides what should happen and how; his chief assistant works out these decisions, so that each subordinate understands his allotted task". With the creation of the Korps in 1809, each had a staff, whose chief was responsible for directing operations and executing the overall headquarters plan.

Issue

Honours

Ancestry

Works
 Grundsätze der Kriegskunst für die Generale (1806)
 Grundsätze der Strategie erläutert durch die Darstellung des Feldzugs 1796 (1814)
 Geschichte des Feldzugs von 1799 in Deutschland und in der Schweiz (1819)

References

Further reading
 Clausewitz, Carl von (2020). Napoleon Absent, Coalition Ascendant: The 1799 Campaign in Italy and Switzerland, Volume 1. Trans and ed. Nicholas Murray and Christopher Pringle. Lawrence, Kansas: University Press of Kansas. 
 Clausewitz, Carl von (2021). The Coalition Crumbles, Napoleon Returns: The 1799 Campaign in Italy and Switzerland, Volume 2. Trans and ed. Nicholas Murray and Christopher Pringle. Lawrence, Kansas: University Press of Kansas. 
 Criste, Oscar "Erzherzog Carl" (3 vols) (Vienna 1912)
 Eysturlid, Lee "The Formative Influences, Theories, and Campaigns of the Archduke Carl of Austria" (2000)
 Hertenberger, H & Wiltschek, F "Erzherzog Karl: der Sieger von Aspern" (1983)
 Rothenberg, Gunther E. Napoleon's Great Adversary: Archduke Charles and the Austrian Army, 1792-1814. Staplehurst: Spellmount, 1995.

External links

 

Field marshals of Austria
Governors of the Habsburg Netherlands
House of Habsburg-Lorraine
Nobility from Florence
Dukes of Teschen
1771 births
1847 deaths
Austrian Empire commanders of the Napoleonic Wars
Austrian Empire military leaders of the French Revolutionary Wars
Austrian generals
Austrian princes
Austrian soldiers
Burials at the Imperial Crypt
Children of Leopold II, Holy Roman Emperor
Expatriates of the Grand Duchy of Tuscany in France
Generals of the Holy Roman Empire
Grand Croix of the Légion d'honneur
Grand Crosses of the Military Order of Maria Theresa
Honorary Knights Grand Cross of the Order of the Bath
Knights of the Golden Fleece of Austria
Military leaders of the French Revolutionary Wars
Military personnel from Florence
Military writers
People with epilepsy
Royalty and nobility with disabilities
Sons of emperors
Writers from the Grand Duchy of Tuscany
Sons of kings